Ainavilli mandal is one of the 22 mandals in Konaseema district of Andhra Pradesh. As per census 2011, there are 17 villages in this mandal.

Demographics 
Ainavilli Mandal has total population of 65,161 as per the Census 2011 out of which 32,858 are males while 32,303 are females. The average Sex Ratio of Ainavilli Mandal is 983. The total literacy rate of Ainavilli Mandal is 78%.

Towns and villages

Villages 
1. Ainavilli
2. Chintana Lanka
3. K Jagannadhapuram
4. Kondukuduru
5. Kotipalli Bhaga
6. Krapa
7. Madupalle
8. Magam
9. Nedunuru
10. Pothukurru
11. Sanapalli Lanka
12. Sirasavalli Savaram
13. Siripalle
14. Totharamudi
15. Veeravallipalem
16. Veluvalapalle
17. Vilasa

See also 
List of mandals in Andhra Pradesh

References 

Mandals in Konaseema district
Mandals in Andhra Pradesh